Joan Withers is a New Zealand businessperson and professional director. She is deputy chair on the board of TVNZ and is the Chairwoman of Mercury Energy, and a member of the NZ Government's Treasury Advisory Board.

A former CEO of Fairfax New Zealand, she left Fairfax in June 2009 but quickly returned to the corporate governance world she exited in 2005. Withers had been a company director since 1997 after leaving the post of CEO of New Zealand's biggest radio company, the Radio Network.

Born in Manchester, England, Ms Withers came to New Zealand as a child with her family, and quit school at 16. She worked full-time as an advertising executive in 1989, and then took on a Master of Business Administration study at Auckland University.

In August 2004, she was appointed to the Feltex Carpet board as its only female director just days before this company launched an IPO in New Zealand for its entire share capital. The $250n issue was almost fully subscribed but the company failed after about two years with all share capital lost. Withers fled the company after it first announced a profit forecast downgrade.

In August 2009, she was appointed to the board of state-owned energy company Mighty River Power, becoming chairwoman within weeks. In October 2009, she was appointed to the TVNZ board, being named deputy chairwoman in August 2010. Other Director roles have included being Chair of Auckland Airport.

She has also been appointed to Sir Stephen Tindall's Tindall Foundation as a trustee.

She has won a number of business awards, including 2015 Supreme Woman of Influence in the New Zealand Women of Influence Awards, the NZ Shareholder Association's Beacon Award for 2014 and the University of Auckland Bright Lights Distinguished Alumni award in 2015.

References

  Director believes in making a difference Retrieved, 8 October 2010

External links 
 TVNZ Board Retrieved, 8 October 2010
 Mighty River Board Retrieved, 30 March 2013

New Zealand women in business
Living people
New Zealand Women of Influence Award recipients
Year of birth missing (living people)